Ganna Gryniva (born 4 July 1989) is a Ukrainian jazz singer working in Berlin. She was born in Russia but raised in Ukraine and Germany. Her songs are in English or Ukrainian.

Life
Gryniva was born in Krasnoyarsk in Russia in the same village as her father, but before she was one she moved to Ukraine where her paternal grandparents lived. Her mother was a pianist and her father was a German philologist. She was home schooled until she moved to Germany with her family as a 13-year-old. Once there she could not access education immediately as she did not speak German, only Russian and Ukrainian. She attended high school in Bernburg. She graduated with a degree in philosophy from the University of Leipzig before studying singing at the Franz Liszt University of Music in Weimar in Weimar with the German singer Michael Schiefel, trumpeter  and Frank Mobus.

She tried working as a journalist but singing had always been an ambition of hers. The band G À N N A was formed with her as vocalist. The group's first album had a title that translates from Ukrainian as "Wild Fox". She wrote and arranged all of their first nine songs for their first album. Her lyrics are in English and Ukrainian and they reference other sources including the poems of Lesya Ukrainka, Nadiia Telenchuk and her father. The band received funding to travel to Ukraine as research. They have performed in Odessa, Kyiv, in Greece and Berlin.

The project known as CHAUD toured that year in Austria, Switzerland and Germany.

In 2022, the short film HANDBOOK by Pavel Mozhar was featured at Short Film festival in Glasgow. The film is about the 2019 Presidential election in Ukraine and its soundtrack was created by Gryniva.

Gryniva was one of the leading musicians from Ukraine in Germany when Russia invaded the country in 2022. She sang at a concert "Songs of Wounding" with Mariana Sadovska in support of Ukraine on 17 March. Gryniva was one of the entertainers at the 10th Fridays for Future event in Berlin in April 2022 singing draped in a Ukrainian flag. She was one of 70 performers who volunteered and she had her own arrangement of a folk song from Ukraine for the concert.

References 

1989 births
Living people
Ukrainian jazz singers